Eric Galen Young (born February 26, 1989) is an American professional racing cyclist, who currently rides for UCI Continental team . Before turning professional, Young attended Indiana University Bloomington and won the Little 500 with the "Cutters" team three years.

Major results
Sources:

2011
 1st  National Criterium Championships
 4th Univest Grand Prix
2012
 Tour of the Gila
1st  Points classification
1st Stage 2
 4th National Criterium Championships
2013
 1st  National Criterium Championships
 Tour de Korea
1st Stages 2 & 4
 4th Vuelta a La Rioja
 10th Overall Tour of Elk Grove
2014
 Grand Prix Cycliste de Saguenay
1st Stages 1 & 2
 1st Stage 6 Vuelta Mexico Telmex
 1st Stage 5 Tour of Utah
2015
 1st Delta Road Race
 Tour of the Gila
1st  Points classification
1st Stage 2
 1st Stage 4 Tour of Utah
2016
 1st Prologue Istrian Spring Trophy
 1st Stage 4 Grand Prix Cycliste de Saguenay
 10th White Spot / Delta Road Race
2017
 Pan American Track Championships
1st  Points race
2nd  Team pursuit
 1st Stage 3 Joe Martin Stage Race
 Tour of the Gila
1st Stages 2 & 4
 3rd  Team pursuit, 2017–18 UCI Track Cycling World Cup, Santiago
2018
 1st  Team pursuit, Pan American Track Championships
 3rd White Spot / Delta Road Race
2019
 Pan American Track Championships
1st  Scratch
2nd  Team pursuit
 1st Stage 4 Tour of the Gila
 2nd  Team pursuit, 2018–19 UCI Track Cycling World Cup, Hong Kong
 3rd  Scratch, 2019–20 UCI Track Cycling World Cup, Minsk
2020
 Tour de Taiwan
1st  Points classification
1st Stages 1, 4 & 5

References

External links

1989 births
Living people
American male cyclists
Indiana University Bloomington alumni
People from Geneva, Illinois